Bornova Anatolian High School (abbreviated as "BAL") is one of the most renowned and prestigious high schools in Turkey.

History

The school was established in 1953 as İzmir College in İzmir. In 1955, it was formed into one of the 6 newly opened Maarif Colleges around different regions of Turkey, which was established by the Ministry of Education, to teach in foreign languages. The area of the school and the buildings such as the marvellous mansion within belonged to Edmond Giraud, a wealthy Levantine of French and British descent who also had property in the centre of Bornova. Giraud sold his property on the condition that it would be used only for education. He also became one of the shareholders of this newly founded school. 

In 1975, the Ministry of Education decided to change the name Maarif College into Anatolian High School. In 1976 the school's name was changed into Bornova Anatolian High School.

Until 1979, the medium of instruction at Bornova Anatolian High School was English. In that year, the school opened its German language department, to teach in German.

Recently, Bornova Anatolian High School has reached to the largest student population within the high schools of Turkey. In 1997, the school opened its French Department, which made it the first Turkish high school to have its medium of instruction in three different foreign languages.

The school teaches most of its classes in Turkish today, but the students receive intensive education in at least two foreign languages as designated by the Anatolian High Schools law.

Education
Bornova Anatolian High School is the second Anatolian High School in Izmir, according to the high school entry points for 3 consequent years. In 2007, in the University Entrance Exam of Turkey, which has over 1.5 million applicants every year, Bornova Anatolian High School had 7 results in top 100, 81 in top 1000 and 304 in top 5000.

Sports
Bornova Anatolian High School is also known for its extracurricular activities and sports teams.

School song

The school song is written and composed by the music teacher of the school, Naci Önöz, in 1965.

References

External links

Bornova Anadolu High School website
BALEV - BAL Educational Fund website
BALMED - BAL Alumni website

High schools in İzmir
Educational institutions established in 1953
1953 establishments in Turkey
Bornova District
Anatolian High Schools